Seyl Nazar (also Romanized as Seyl Naz̧ar) is a village in Beyranvand-e Jonubi Rural District, Bayravand District, Khorramabad County, Lorestan Province, Iran. At the 2006 census, its population was 113, in 24 families.

References 

Towns and villages in Khorramabad County